DWNC-13 is a VHF TV station owned by the Intercontinental Broadcasting Corporation. The station's currently inactive.

See also 
 List of Intercontinental Broadcasting Corporation channels and stations

Intercontinental Broadcasting Corporation
Television stations in Naga, Camarines Sur
Television channels and stations established in 1974